Ehrenburg may refer to:

Places
 Ehrenburg, Arizona
 Ehrenburg, Lower Saxony, a municipality in the district of Diepholz, Lower Saxony, Germany

Castles and palaces
 Ehrenburg (Coburg), Bavaria, Germany
 Ehrenburg (Brodenbach), Rhineland-Palatinate, Germany
 Ehrenburg (Plaue), Thuringia, Germany
 Ehrenburg (Kiens), South Tyrol, Italy

People with the surname
 Ilya Ehrenburg (1891–1967), Soviet poet, translator, and writer

See also 

 Ehrenberg (disambiguation)